The Ukrainian Athletic Federation (UAF) - is the governing body for the sport of athletics in Ukraine. Acting President of the Athletics Federation of Ukraine in January 2023 was Yevhen Pronin.

History 
UAF was founded in 1991 and was affiliated to the IAAF in 1993.  

Former presidents:
 1991–1996: Yuriy Tumasov
 1996–2012: Valeriy Borzov
 2012-2020: Ihor Hotsul
 2020-22: Ravil Safiullin 
 2020-22: Yevhen Pronin

Affiliations 
UAF is the national member federation for Ukraine in the following international organisations:
 World Athletics (WA)
 European Athletics (EA)
 Association of Balkan Athletic Federations (ABAF)

National records 
UAF maintains the Ukrainian records in athletics.

Kit suppliers 
Ukraine's kits are currently supplied by Nike.

References

External links 
 Official website 

Ukraine
Athletics
Athletics in Ukraine
National governing bodies for athletics
Sports organizations established in 1991
1991 establishments in Ukraine